The Bombay Scottish School, Powai (BSS or BSS Powai), also popularly known as Scottish, is a private, Christian co-educational day school located in Powai in Mumbai, India. It is an affiliate of Bombay Scottish School, Mahim. The institution was established on 21 June 1997 by Mark David.

The school caters to pupils from kindergarten up to class 10 and the medium of instruction is English. The school is affiliated with the Council for the Indian School Certificate Examinations, New Delhi, which conducts the ICSE examinations at the close of class 10.

School shield and crest 
The school shield represents the Cross of St. Andrew, the patron saint of Scotland. The white crux decussata (cross) quarters the shield into four segments, each representing a house colour denoted by the Fleur-de-lis (blue house), the Castle (red house), the Lion (green house) and the Palm Tree (yellow house).

School flag and motto 
The school flag features the white cross of St. Andrew against a blue band. St. Andrew is the patron saint of Scotland. It bears the 'Crux decussata'. The flag is flown during ceremonial occasions like the school's Sports Day. The school's motto is "Perseverantia et Fide in Deo (Latin)" which means perseverance and faith in God.

Curriculum 
The Bombay Scottish School follows the syllabus of the Indian Certificate of Secondary Education (ICSE) since 20th September,  2000. English is the medium of instruction. Hindi is taught as a second language and Marathi is taught as a third language. Tests are conducted periodically and examinations are held at the end of every school term.

Culture 
Bombay Scottish is a cosmopolitan school. Although the majority of the pupils are Hindu by religion, the school attempts to impart Christian values. The Christmas Concert is celebrated every December and a sports meet and a farewell party for students who are passing out of the institution are held.

Management 
The school is managed by the Committee of Management, the Board of Trustees for the Bombay Scottish Orphanage Society. The Principal of this school is Jane Kotian, who manages the general administration. The Senior Academic Coordinator, Ms Esther Selvaraj manages the academics and co-curricular activities of the school. There are Academic coordinators at the Junior School, Middle School and High School levels.
 Junior School Co-ordinator: Tina Quadras
 Upper Primary Co-ordinator: Mithua Chakravorty
 Middle School Co-ordinator: Harpreet Kaur
 High School Co-ordinator: Monica David

House system 
The main objective of the House System is to foster a sense of collective responsibility and solidarity amongst students. The House System also serves as the centre of school life, with houses often competing at sports and other co-curricular activities.
There are four school houses – Blue, Green, Red, Yellow. The boys' house names are named after Scottish missionaries and the girls' are named after British queens.

See also
 List of schools in Mumbai

References

External links

Private schools in Mumbai
Educational institutions established in 1997
1997 establishments in Maharashtra